Gavdul (also Romanized as Gāvdūl) is a village in Khanandabil-e Sharqi Rural District, in the Central District of Khalkhal County, Ardabil Province, Iran. At the 2006 census, its population was 100, in 24 families.

References 

Tageo

Towns and villages in Khalkhal County